Min Htin Ko Ko Gyi (born ) is a Burmese documentary filmmaker, poet, and former political prisoner. He has directed 8 feature-length films and 2 documentaries. His 2010 film, Floating Tomatoes, won best documentary at the 2010 Documentary Film Association of Southeast Asian States. He founded the Human Dignity Film Institute, to train young filmmakers, in 2013. Between 2013 and 2017, he organised the Human Rights Human Dignity film festival in Myanmar.

In early 2019, he posted a series of Facebook posts criticising the Tatmadaw, and questioning the legitimacy of the 2008 Constitution of Myanmar, which was drafted by the military junta. In April 2019, he was arrested, despite having undergone surgery for liver cancer recently. On 29 August 2019, he was sentenced to 1 year of hard labour under section 505(a) of Myanmar's Penal Code, and released on 21 February 2020. 

On 1 February 2021, in the wake of the 2021 Myanmar coup d'état, he was re-arrested, becoming one the first individuals to be arrested after the coup, alongside other veteran political prisoners like Maung Tha Cho, Than Myint Aung, and Mya Aye. He remained imprisoned at Insein Prison until his release in November 2022.

Filmography 

 Human Zoo (2005)
 Beyond the Dream (2006)
 Strand (2007)
 The Last Poem (2008)
 Moonlight Sonata (2008)
 On the Trail of Clouds (2009)
 Floating Tomatoes (2010)
 Thanakha (2012)
 Father's School (2012)

Personal life 
He has one daughter, Me Min Htin.

References 

Burmese writers
Living people
1961 births
Burmese prisoners and detainees
Burmese male poets
Burmese film directors